Dryocosmus imbricariae, the banded bullet gall wasp, is a species of gall wasp in the family Cynipidae.

References

Further reading

 

Cynipidae
Insects described in 1896

Gall-inducing insects
Taxa named by William Harris Ashmead
Taxa described in 1896